Jiljilyya is a Palestinian village in the Ramallah and al-Bireh Governorate in the northern West Bank.

Location
It is bordered by Al Mazra'a ash Sharqiya  to the east,  Sinjil to the east and north, 'Abwein to the north, west and south, and by Silwad  to the south.

History 

Pottery sherds from the Iron Age II, Roman, Byzantine Byzantine/Umayyad, and the Crusader/Ayyubid eras have been found here.

Ottoman era
The village was incorporated into the Ottoman Empire in 1517 with all of Palestine, and in 1596 it appeared in the Ottoman tax registers as Jinjiliyya, being in the nahiya (subdistrict) of Quds, part of the liwa (district) of Quds. It had a population of 8 households, all Muslims. The villagers paid a fixed tax rate of 33.3% on various agricultural products, including wheat, barley, summer crops, olive trees, vineyards, fruit trees, goats and/or beehives, in addition to "occasional revenues"; a total of 2,600 akçe. Pottery sherds from the early Ottoman era have also been found here.

In 1838 Edward Robinson noted Jiljilia on his travels in the region, and connected it with ancient Gilgal. He further noted it  as a Muslim village,   located in the Beni Zeid district, north of Jerusalem. 

In 1870 Victor Guérin found Djildjilia to have 200 inhabitants, while an Ottoman village list of about the same year counted 14 houses and a population of 49 in dschildschilija, though the population count included only men. 

In 1882, the PEF's Survey of Western Palestine (SWP) described Jiljilia as: "A large village on the top of a high hill, with a well to the south, and a few olives. The ridge is arable land."

In 1896 the population of  Dschildschilja was estimated to be about 138 persons.

British Mandate era
In the 1922 census of Palestine conducted by the British Mandate authorities, Jeljelieh had a population of 162 Muslims, increasing in the 1931 census to 212 Muslims, in 47 houses.

In the 1945 statistics, the population was 280 Muslims, while the total land area was 7,283 dunams, according to an official land and population survey. Of  this, 1,897 were  plantations and irrigable land, 1,940 for cereals, while 16 dunams were classified as built-up (urban) areas.

Jordanian era
In the wake of the 1948 Arab–Israeli War, and after the 1949 Armistice Agreements, Jiljilyya came under Jordanian rule. It was annexed by Jordan in 1950.

The Jordanian census of 1961 found 490 inhabitants in Jiljiliya.

Post-1967
Since the Six-Day War in 1967, Jiljilyya  has been under Israeli occupation.    

After the 1995 accords, 99.3% of  village land was classified as Area A, while the remaining 0.7% was classified as Area B.

Death of Omar Assad
In January 2022, 78-year-old Omar Assad died after being detained by Israeli soldiers. Assad had lived in the US from 1967, was a US citizen, and had returned to his childhood village for his retirement in 2010. The Israeli spokesman stated that Assad  was alive when he was released, but this was contradicted by several eye-witnesses. The autopsy found that he had died  from “a stress-induced heart attack probably brought on by being bound and gagged and held in a cold construction site.” 
In February, the US State Department said it wanted a “criminal investigation” into his death.

In October, Israeli spokesperson claimed that a settlement had been reached with the Assad family, and that Israel would pay them  500,000 shekels, (~$141,000), in return for their  withdrawal of  the case against the Israeli state. However, the family denied this, saying that they had rejected the offer.

References

Bibliography

External links 
Welcome To Jiljilyya
Jiljilia, Welcome to Palestine
Survey of Western Palestine, Map 14:   IAA, Wikimedia commons 
Jilijliya Village (Fact Sheet),  Applied Research Institute–Jerusalem, ARIJ
Jilijliya Village Profile, ARIJ
Jilijliya areal photo, ARIJ

Ramallah and al-Bireh Governorate
Villages in the West Bank
Municipalities of the State of Palestine